The 1914 Giro di Lombardia was the tenth edition of the Giro di Lombardia cycle race and was held on 25 October 1914, over a course of .

44 cyclists departed from Milan and 29 finished the race.

General classification

References

1914
Giro di Lombardia
Giro di Lombardia